Below is a list of Canadian plants by genus.  Due to the vastness of Canada's biodiversity, this page is divided.

This is a (partial) list of the plant species considered native to Canada. Many of the plants seen in Canada are introduced, either intentionally or accidentally. For these plants, see List of introduced species to Canada.

A | B | C | D | E | F | G | H | I J K | L | M | N | O | P Q | R | S | T | U V W | X Y Z

Da 

 Dalea — prairie clovers
 Dalea purpurea — prairie clover
 Dalibarda — dewdrops
 Dalibarda repens — dewdrop, false violet, robin-run-away, star violet
 Danthonia — oatgrasses
 Danthonia compressa — flattened oatgrass, flat-stemmed danthonia
 Danthonia spicata — poverty oatgrass

De 

 Decodon — willowherbs
 Decodon verticillatus — swamp willowherb, water oleander, water willow, hairy swamp loosestrife
 Dennstaedtia — hay-scented ferns
 Dennstaedtia punctilobula — eastern hay-scented fern
 Deparia — glade ferns
 Deparia acrostichoides — silvery glade fern, silvery spleenwort
 Deschampsia — hairgrasses
 Deschampsia atropurpurea — mountain hairgrass
 Deschampsia cespitosa subsp. cespitosa — tufted hairgrass, tussock grass
 Deschampsia flexuosa — wavy hairgrass, crinkled hairgrass
 Descurainia — tansy-mustards
 Descurainia pinnata — western tansy-mustard, green tansy-mustard, shortfruit tansy-mustard
 Descurainia richardsonii — Richardson's tansy-mustard
 Desmodium — tick-trefoils
 Desmodium canadense — Canadian tick-trefoil, showy tick-trefoil
 Desmodium canescens
 Desmodium cuspidatum — toothed tick-trefoil
 Desmodium glutinosum — pointy-leaved tick-trefoil, large tick-trefoil
 Desmodium illinoense — Illinois tick-trefoil Extirpated
 Desmodium nudiflorum — bare-stemmed tick-trefoil, naked-flowered tick-trefoil
 Desmodium paniculatum var. dillenii
 Desmodium paniculatum var. paniculatum
 Desmodium rotundifolium — roundleaf tick-trefoil, prostrate tick-trefoil, dollar leaf

Di 

 Diarrhena — beak grasses
 Diarrhena obovata — beak grass
 Dicentra — dicentras
 Dicentra canadensis — squirrel corn
 Dicentra cucullaria — Dutchman's-breeches, soldier's cap
 Diervilla — bush honeysuckles
 Diervilla lonicera — northern bush honeysuckle
 Digitaria — witchgrasses
 Digitaria cognata — fall witchgrass
 Dioscorea — 
 Dioscorea quaternata — fourleaf wild-yam
 Diphasiastrum — clubmosses
 Diphasiastrum complanatum — trailing clubmoss, northern ground-cedar, northern running-pine, flat-branched clubmoss, trailing evergreen, Christmas green, ground-pine
 Diphasiastrum digitatum — fan clubmoss, southern running-pine, southern ground-cedar, fan ground-pine, crowfoot clubmoss, trailing ground-pine
 Diphasiastrum sabinifolium — ground-fir, savinleaf clubmoss, heath-cypress
 Diphasiastrum sitchense — Sitka clubmoss, tufted ground-cedar, Alaskan clubmoss
 Diphasiastrum tristachyum — three-spiked clubmoss, blue ground-cedar, northern ground-pine
 Diplazium — glade ferns
 Diplazium pycnocarpon — narrowleaf glade fern, narrowleaf spleenwort
 Dirca — leatherwoods
 Dirca palustris — leatherwoods, ropebark, moosewood, wicopy

Do 

 Doellingeria — flattop white aster
 Doellingeria umbellata var. pubens — hairy flattop white aster
 Doellingeria umbellata var. umbellata — tall flattop white aster, parasol whitetop

Dr 

 Draba — whitlowgrasses
 Draba alpina — alpine whitlowgrass
 Draba arabisans — rock whitlowgrass
 Draba aurea — golden whitlowgrass, golden draba
 Draba cana — canescent whitlowgrass, hairyfruit whitlowgrass
 Draba cinerea — ashy whitlowgrass, greyleaf whitlowgrass
 Draba glabella — smooth whitlowgrass
 Draba incana — hoary whitlowgrass
 Draba lactea — milky whitlowgrass
 Draba nemorosa — woodland whitlowgrass
 Draba nivalis — snow whitlowgrass, snow draba, yellow arctic whitlowgrass
 Draba norvegica — Norwegian whitlowgrass
 Draba reptans — Carolina whitlowgrass
 Dracocephalum — dragonheads
 Dracocephalum parviflorum — American dragonhead, dragonhead mint
 Drosera — sundews
 Drosera anglica — English sundew
 Drosera intermedia — spoonleaf sundew, spatulate-leaf sundew, floating sundew, narrowleaf sundew
 Drosera linearis — slenderleaf sundew, linear-leaf sundew
 Drosera rotundifolia — roundleaf sundew, dewplant
 Dryas — mountain avens
 Dryas drummondii — yellow mountain avens, Drummond's dryad
 Dryas integrifolia — white mountain avens
 Dryopteris — woodferns
 Dryopteris carthusiana — spinulose woodfern, spinulose shieldfern, toothed woodfern, narrow Buckler fern
 Dryopteris clintoniana — Clinton's woodfern
 Dryopteris cristata — crested woodfern
 Dryopteris expansa — spreading woodfern, northern Buckler fern, northern woodfern
 Dryopteris filix-mas — male fern, 
 Dryopteris fragrans — fragrant woodfern
 Dryopteris goldieana — Goldie's woodfern
 Dryopteris intermedia — evergreen woodfern
 Dryopteris marginalis — marginal woodfern, leather woodfern

Du 

 Dulichium — threeway sedges
 Dulichium arundinaceum — threeway sedge
 Dupontia — tundra grasses
 Dupontia fisheri — Fischer's tundra grass, Fischer's dupontia

Dy 

 Dyssodia — dogweeds
 Dyssodia papposa — fœtid dogweed

References 

See: Flora of Canada#References

Canada,genus,D